Verkhny Ufaley is a town in Chelyabinsk Oblast, Russia, located on the Ufaley River (a tributary of the Ufa River),  northwest of Chelyabinsk, the administrative center of the oblast. Population:

History
One of the oldest populated places in the Ural region, it was founded in 1761 and was granted town status on April 26, 1940.

Administrative and municipal status
Within the framework of administrative divisions, it is, together with fourteen rural localities, incorporated as the Town of Verkhny Ufaley—an administrative unit with the status equal to that of the districts. As a municipal division, the Town of Verkhny Ufaley is incorporated as Verkhneufaleysky Urban Okrug.

Economy

Verkhny Ufaley is rich in mineral deposits (nickel and iron ores, marble, fire clay) and the economy of the town and the surrounding areas is heavily dependent on metallurgical factories, such as "UZMM" (Ufaley Metallurgical Machinery Works) and "Ufaleynickel". The latter, in particular, is the town's largest industrial enterprise, responsible for 75% of the total volume of the goods produced and much of the town's employment.

Lake Itkul
It is fed by springs, creeks, and small rivers, so its waters renew within a year and are fresh and clean. The lake is clear but has a brownish reflection. The lake and its vicinity have become a popular destination for Verkhny Ufaley's residents and visitors alike.

Sports
The bandy club Nikelshchik plays in the second highest division, Russian Bandy Supreme League. Their spectator numbers stand out. Whereas it's unusual in their division to reach 1 000, they usually have a couple of thousand.

References

Notes

Sources

External links
Official website of Verkhny Ufaley 
Official website of "Ufaleynickel" 
Unofficial website of Verkhny Ufaley 

Cities and towns in Chelyabinsk Oblast
Yekaterinburgsky Uyezd
Monotowns in Russia